Hubert Walton Harrold (9 March 1898 – 14 April 1968), known as Bert Harold, was an Australian rules footballer who played with East Perth in the West Australian Football League (WAFL).

Football
Harrold, a member of four East Perth premiership teams, was a half-forward flanker in the club's 1920, 1921 and 1922 grand final wins. He was a wingman in the 1923 premiership side, captained by his brother Vern. A Western Australian interstate representative, he made four appearances in the 1924 Hobart Carnival. He played for his state on one further occasion and kicked eight goals in total from his five matches. When a "Team of the Century" was named in 2006, based on the period 1906 to 1944, Harrold was named on a half forward flank.

Cricket
He was also a good enough cricketer to represent Western Australia in a first-class fixture during the 1925/26 cricket season, against a Herbie Collins-led Australian XI at the WACA. He was the last person to bat in the first innings but contributed an unbeaten 21. A right-arm fast bowler, he then took 2/89 from 21 overs with the ball, taking the wickets of both openers, the Australian XI captain and Jack Ryder. When Harrold batted the second time, Ryder trapped him leg before wicket without scoring, to give his side victory by an innings and 45 runs.

References

1898 births
1968 deaths
Australian rules footballers from Perth, Western Australia
Australian Rules footballers: place kick exponents
East Perth Football Club players
Australian cricketers

Western Australia cricketers
Cricketers from Western Australia